David Gentilcore (born Hamilton, Canada, 1961), is Professor of Modern History at the Ca' Foscari University of Venice (and previously at the University of Leicester), with particular interests in the history of popular religion, the history of medicine and health, and the history of food and diet. His Medical Charlatanism in Early Modern Italy (Oxford University Press, 2006) was awarded the Royal Society of Canada's "Dr Jason A. Hannah medal" in 2008 and in 2012 he was awarded the "Salvatore De Renzi International Prize" for his contribution to the history of medicine, by the University of Salerno medical school and the Ordine dei Medici of Salerno. He has held visiting professorships at McMaster University (Canada) and Villa I Tatti (The Harvard Center for Italian Renaissance Studies), Florence, and visiting fellowships at IMéRA - Institute for Advanced Study, Aix-Marseille University (France) and the School of Advanced Study, University of London. He has been the recipient of research grants from the European Research Council (a five-year Advanced Grant), the European Institutes for Advanced Study Fellowship Programme, the Economic and Social Research Council, the Wellcome Trust, the Leverhulme Trust, and the Arts and Humanities Research Board (now AHRC). He is the son of historical geographer Rocco Louis Gentilcore.

Published books 
From Bishop to Witch: The System of the Sacred in Early Modern Terra d'Otranto (Manchester: Manchester University Press, 1992). Italian trans. Il vescovo e la strega (Nardò: Besa Editrice, 2003).
Healers and Healing in Early Modern Italy (Manchester: Manchester University Press, 1998).
Medical Charlatanism in Early Modern Italy (Oxford: Oxford University Press, 2006).
Malattia e guarigione. Ciarlatani, guaritori e seri professionisti (Nardò: Edizioni ControLuce, 2008).
Pomodoro! A History of the Tomato in Italy (New York: Columbia University Press, 2010). Italian trans. La purpurea meraviglia. Storia del pomodoro in Italia (Milan: Garzanti, 2010).
Italy and the Potato: a History, 1550-2000 (London: Continuum, 2012). Italian trans. Italiani mangiapatate. Fortuna e sfortuna della patata nel Belpaese (Bologna: il Mulino, 2013).
Food and Health in Early Modern Europe (London: Bloomsbury, 2016).
 co-editor (along with Matthew Smith), Proteins, Pathologies and Politics: Dietary Innovation and Disease from the Nineteenth Century (London: Bloomsbury, 2018)

References

People associated with the University of Leicester
Living people
1961 births